Samuel Hawgood (born c. 1953) is a pediatrician, researcher, Arthur and Toni Rembe Rock Distinguished professor, and the tenth chancellor of the University of California, San Francisco. He obtained his medical degree (MBBS) from the University of Queensland and completed residency at the Royal Children’s Hospital, Brisbane. Previously, he served as the Dean of the UCSF School of Medicine.

References

1953 births
Living people
Australian expatriates in the United States
Australian paediatricians
People from San Francisco
University of California, San Francisco faculty
University of Queensland alumni
University of Queensland Mayne Medical School alumni